Cowley is a rural locality in the Cassowary Coast Region, Queensland, Australia.

History 
The locaty takes its name from the town of Cowley Beach which was formerly named Inarlinga, but which was renamed on 16 November 1991 after the name of the beach. The beach was named after horticulturalist Ebenezer Cowley who was the overseer at Kamerunga State Nursery.

References 

Cassowary Coast Region
Localities in Queensland